The following lists events that happened during 1931 in South Africa.

Incumbents
 Monarch: King George V.
 Governor-General: 
 Jacob de Villiers (until 26 January).
 The Earl of Clarendon (starting 26 January)
 Prime Minister: James Barry Munnik Hertzog.
 Chief Justice: Jacob de Villiers.

Events
January
 26 – George Villiers, 6th Earl of Clarendon, is appointed the 5th Governor-General of the Union of South Africa.

December
 11 – The Statute of Westminster establishes a status of legislative equality between the self-governing dominions of the Commonwealth of Australia, Canada, Irish Free State, Dominion of Newfoundland, Dominion of New Zealand and Union of South Africa.

Births
 21 January – Joseph Engenas Matlhakanye Lekganyane, founder of the St Engenas Zion Christian Church.
 10 March – Raymond Ackerman, businessman, founder of Pick 'n Pay supermarket group.
 19 April – Kobie Coetsee, politician, in Ladybrand. (d. 2000)
 5 July – Ismail Mahomed, South African and Namibian Chief Justice. (d. 2000)
 15 July – Gene Louw, politician.
 27 September – Thandi Klaasen, jazz musician (d. 2017).
 4 October – Basil D'Oliveira, cricketer (d. 2011)
 7 October – Desmond Tutu, social rights activist and Anglican bishop, in Klerksdorp (d. 2021).
 24 November – Arthur Chaskalson, President of the Constitutional Court of South Africa & Chief Justice of South Africa.
 12 December – Jafta Masemola, anti-apartheid activist. (d. 1994)
 31 December – Dorothy Nyembe, activist and politician (d. 1998).

Deaths
 9 January – Second Boer War General Johannes Gerhardus Celliers at age 70.
 24 January – Sir Percy FitzPatrick, author, politician and mining financier. (b. 1862)
 24 October – Sir Murray Bisset, South African cricketer and Governor of Southern Rhodesia (b. 1876)

Railways

Railway lines opened
 3 June – Cape – Molteno to Jamestown, .
 1 July – Natal – Chailey to Mount Alida, .
 1 July – Natal – Greyville Cabin to Berea Road, .

Locomotives
Two new narrow gauge steam locomotive types enter service on the South African Railways (SAR):
 A single light Class NG G14 2-6-2+2-6-2 Garratt articulated steam locomotive.
 Three 2-8-2 Mikado locomotives for the Otavi Mining and Railway Company in South West Africa. In 1960 they would become the Class NG15 Apple Express Kalaharis on the narrow gauge Avontuur Railway.

Sports

Rugby
 19 December – The South African Springboks beat Ireland 8–3 in Ireland.

References

History of South Africa